Alliance for Change may refer to:

 Alliance for Change (Guyana)
 Alliance for Change (Macau)
 Alleanza Bidla (meaning "Alliance for Chance" in Maltese)
 Alliance for Change (Mexico)
 Alliance for Change (Panama)
 Alliance for Change (Venezuela)
 Alliance for Democratic Changes, a government coalition in Bosnia and Herzegovina
 Kukuriku coalition, a Croatian organization formerly known as Alliance for Change